The S2 is a service on the Nuremberg S-Bahn.

Network

References

External links
 

Nuremberg S-Bahn lines
1992 establishments in Germany